The USA Basketball Women's National Team, commonly known as the United States women's national basketball team, is governed by USA Basketball and competes in FIBA Americas. The team is by far the most successful in international women's basketball, having won nine out of the eleven Olympic tournaments it had entered. It has also won nine of the last twelve World Cups (including the last four), and eleven titles overall. The team is currently ranked first in the FIBA World Rankings.

In 2016, it was named the USA Basketball Team of the Year for a record sixth time (having been previously honored in 1996, 2000, 2004, 2008, and 2012). It was also named the USOC Team of the Year in 1996.

The team is one of the most dominant in all Olympic sports, with a 70–3 record in Olympic play, and a record seven consecutive titles. They have no Olympic losses since 1992, no losses in any tournament since 2006, and their gold medal in 2021 tied the US men's basketball team's record (1936–1968) for the most consecutive Olympic team victories in all Olympic sports.

Competitive record

Olympic Games

FIBA World Cup

Team

Current roster
Roster for the 2022 FIBA Women's Basketball World Cup.

Past rosters

Olympic Games
1976 Summer Olympics
1984 Summer Olympics
1988 Summer Olympics
1992 Summer Olympics
1996 Summer Olympics
2000 Summer Olympics
2004 Summer Olympics
2008 Summer Olympics
2012 Summer Olympics
2016 Summer Olympics
2020 Summer Olympics

FIBA World Cup
1953 FIBA World Championship
1957 FIBA World Championship
1964 FIBA World Championship
1967 FIBA World Championship
1971 FIBA World Championship
1975 FIBA World Championship
1979 FIBA World Championship
1983 FIBA World Championship
1986 FIBA World Championship
1990 FIBA World Championship
1994 FIBA World Championship
1998 FIBA World Championship
2002 FIBA World Championship
2006 FIBA World Championship
2010 FIBA World Championship
2014 FIBA World Championship
2018 FIBA World Cup
2022 FIBA World Cup

Records

Olympic

Players medal leaders

Coaching staff

List of head coaches
 Billie Moore (1975 PAG, 1976 Oly)
 Pat Summitt  (1979 PAG, 1979 WC, 1979 JC, 1983 WC, 1984 Oly, 1984 JC)
 Kay Yow (1981 WUG, 1986 Good, 1986 WC, 1988 Oly)
 Theresa Grentz (1985 JC, 1990 Good, 1990 WC, 1992 Oly)
 Tara VanDerveer (1991 WUG, 1994 Good, 1994 WC, 1996 Oly)
 Nell Fortner (1998 JC, 1998 WC, 1999 PAG, 2000 Oly)
 Van Chancellor (2002 WC, 2004 Oly)
 Anne Donovan (2006 WC, 2008 Oly)
 Geno Auriemma (2010 WC, 2012 Oly, 2014 WC, 2016 Oly)
 Dawn Staley (2007 PAG, 2018 WC, 2019 Amer, 2021 Amer, 2021 Oly)

Olympic records

Statistics

Games

Points

Highest field goal percentage

Highest 3-point field goal percentage

3-point field goals have been kept as an official statistic since the 1988 Olympics.

Highest free throw percentage

Rebounds

Assists

Steals

Steals have been kept as an official statistic since the 1984 Olympics.

Blocks

Blocks have been kept as an official statistic since the 1984 Olympics.

Most points averaged

Players records for a game

Team records (in a game)

All-time results

World Cup

All-time results

See also
United States women's national under-19 basketball team
United States women's national under-17 basketball team
United States women's Pan American basketball team
United States women's World University Games basketball team
United States women's William Jones Cup basketball team
United States women's national 3x3 team
Timeline of women's basketball
United States men's national basketball team
United States men's national under-19 basketball team
United States men's national under-17 basketball team
USA Basketball
Basketball in the United States

References

External links

FIBA profile

 
Women's national basketball teams
Women's basketball teams in the United States